Wabash Valley Art Spaces, incorporated as Art Spaces, Inc. — Wabash Valley Outdoor Sculpture Collection, is a non-profit arts organization based in Terre Haute, Indiana and serving the Wabash Valley region. It sponsors the creation and installation of site-specific outdoor sculpture. Art Spaces also has sponsored public events including the Max Ehrmann Poetry Competition, which corresponded with the installation of Max Ehrmann at the Crossroads in 2010.

Philosophy
The Art Spaces mission statement states the organization exists "to establish a collection of public outdoor sculpture" in the area it serves.

Collection
Works are located throughout the Wabash Valley area and include:
 Flame of the Millennium by Leonardo Nierman (located at Rose-Hulman Institute of Technology)
 TREE by Mark Wallis
 Composite House for Terre Haute by Lauren Ewing 
 Spirit of Space by Bob Emser
 Gatekeeper by Sally Rogers (located at the Vigo County Public Library)
 Emanating Connections by Chakaia Booker (located on the campus of Indiana State University)
 Runner by Doug Kornfeld (located on the campus of Indiana State University)
 Max Ehrmann at the Crossroads by Bill Wolfe

See also
 List of public art in Terre Haute, Indiana

References

Non-profit organizations based in Indiana
Arts organizations based in Indiana
American sculpture
Terre Haute, Indiana